Cladiscites is an extinct genus of cephalopods in the ammonoid order Ceratitida. These nektonic carnivores  lived during the Triassic, from Carnian to Rhaetian age.

Description
This genus survived at the extinction event at the end of the Permian.

Distribution
Fossils of species within this family have been found in the Triassic of Afghanistan, Hungary, Italy, Oman, Tajikistan, United States and the East Indies.

References
Notes

Weblinks
 James Perrin Smith Upper Triassic marine invertebrate faunas of North America
 Mikko's Phylogeny Archive

Triassic ammonites
Ammonites of Europe
Carnian genus first appearances
Norian genera
Rhaetian genus extinctions